Configuration Management (CM) is an ITIL version 2 and an IT Service Management (ITSM) process that tracks all of the individual Configuration Items (CI) in an IT system which may be as simple as a single server, or as complex as the entire IT department. In large organizations a configuration manager may be appointed to oversee and manage the CM process. In ITIL version 3, this process has been renamed as Service Asset and Configuration Management.

References

Configuration management